This is a list of records for the Minnesota Golden Gophers women's ice hockey team.

NCAA Career Records

Source.

Career Records

Source.  For all per-game career records, the player's career must be complete to be included.

Points

Points Per Game

Goals

Goals Per Game

Assists

Assists Per Game

Points by a Defender

Goals by a Defender

Assists by a Defender

Power-Play Goals

Shorthanded Goals

Game-Winning Goals

Shots on Goal

Shots Per Game

Games Played

Plus/Minus

Penalties

Penalty Minutes

Goaltender Wins

Fewest Goaltender Losses

Minimum 5 Games Played.

Goaltender Shutouts

Goaltender Saves

Saves per Game

Goals Against Average

Minimum 300 minutes.

Save Percentage

Minimum 100 saves.

Individual seasonal records

Source.

Points

Points Per Game

Goals

Goals Per Game

Assists

Assists Per Game

Points by a Defender

Goals by a Defender

Assists by a Defender

Points by a Rookie

Goals by a Rookie

Assists by a Rookie

Power-Play Goals

Game-Winning Goals

Shorthanded Goals

Shots on Goal

Shots Per Game

Plus/Minus

Penalties

Penalty Minutes

Goaltender Wins

Saves

Saves Per Game

Minimum 10 games.

Goals Against Average

Minimum 500 minutes.

Save Percentage

Minimum 100 saves.

Shutouts

Awards and honors

All-Americans

Source.

National Rookie of the Year 

Source.

All-WCHA teams

Source.

WCHA Most Valuable Player / Player of the Year 

Source.

WCHA Student-Athlete of the Year 

Source.

WCHA Offensive Player of the Year 

Source.

WCHA Defensive Player of the Year

Source.

WCHA Goaltender of the Year 

Source.

WCHA Rookie of the Year 

Source.

WCHA Coach of the Year 

Source.

WCHA All-Rookie Team

Source.

Patty Kazmaier Memorial Award finalists

As of March 26, 2022, the following players have been named as Finalists for the Patty Kazmaier Memorial Award, presented annually to the top player in NCAA Division I women's ice hockey.

References

Minnesota Golden Gophers women's ice hockey
University of Minnesota